Henri Marie Ducrotay de Blainville (12 September 1777 – 1 May 1850) was a French zoologist and anatomist.

Life
Blainville was born at Arques, near Dieppe. As a young man he went to Paris to study art, but ultimately devoted himself to natural history. He attracted the attention of Georges Cuvier, for whom he occasionally substituted as lecturer at the Collège de France and at the Athenaeum Club, London. In 1812 he was aided by Cuvier in acquiring the position of assistant professor of anatomy and zoology in the Faculty of Sciences at Paris. Eventually, relations between the two men soured, a situation that ended in open enmity.

In 1819, Blainville was elected a member of the American Philosophical Society in Philadelphia. In 1825 he was admitted a member of the French Academy of Sciences; and in 1830 he was appointed to succeed Jean-Baptiste Lamarck in the chair of natural history at the museum. Two years later, on the death of Cuvier, he obtained the chair of comparative anatomy, of which he proved himself a worthy successor to his former teacher. 
In 1837, he was elected a foreign member of the Royal Swedish Academy of Sciences. On May 1, 1850, he died from an attack of apoplexy in a railway carriage at the Embarcadère du Havre (current Gare Saint-Lazare) in Paris.

He was the taxonomic authority of numerous zoological species, extinct and extant; including the eponymous Blainville's beaked whale, Mesoplodon densirostris.

In the field of herpetology, he adopted Pierre André Latreille's proposal of separating Amphibia from Reptilia, and then (1816) developed a unique arrangement in regards to sub-groupings, using organs of generation as primary criteria. He described several new species of reptiles.

Blainville rejected evolution. He was a critic of Lamarck's evolutionary ideas but similar to Lamarck proposed a great chain of being.

It was in 1822 that he coined the term paleontology.

Taxon named in his honor 
Blainville is commemorated in the scientific names of several species, such as the 
North American lizard Phrynosoma blainvillii. 
The fossil actinopterygian fish Aeduella blainvillei from the Permian period of Europe.
The deep-bodied pipefish (Leptonotus blainvilleanus) (Eydoux & Gervais, 1837) is a species of marine fish belonging to the family Syngnathidae.

Selected writings
Sur les ichthyolites, ou, Les poissons fossiles (1818) - On "ichthyolites", or fossil fish.
De l'organisation des animaux, ou Principes d'anatomie comparée (1822) - On the organization of animals, or principles of comparative anatomy.
Manuel de malacologie et de conchyliologie (1825-1827) - Manual of malacology and conchology.
Cours de physiologie générale et comparée (1829) - Course of general and comparative physiology. 
Manuel d'actinologie, ou de zoophytologie (1834) - Manual of actinology [the study of the chemical effects of visible and ultraviolet light] or zoophytology.
Ostéographie ou description iconographique comparée du squelette et du système dentaire des mammifères récents et fossiles (1839–64) - Osteography or comparative iconographical descriptions of the skeleton and teeth of living and fossil mammals.

Taxon described by him
See :Category:Taxa named by Henri Marie Ducrotay de Blainville

References

Attribution

1777 births
1850 deaths
19th-century French zoologists
Burials at Père Lachaise Cemetery
Conchologists
Critics of Lamarckism
Foreign Members of the Royal Society
French anatomists
French herpetologists
French taxonomists
French zoologists
Members of the French Academy of Sciences
Members of the Royal Swedish Academy of Sciences
People from Seine-Maritime
Teuthologists
National Museum of Natural History (France) people